May Tamang Balita formally May Tamang Balita atbp. is a Philippine television news satire show broadcast by GMA News TV. Originally hosted by Janna Dominguez, Maey Bautista, Ramon Bautista and Sheena Halili, it premiered on March 4, 2011. The show concluded on February 7, 2013 with a total of 100 episodes.

Segments

Regular Segments
'Bulag na Katotohanan' - Hosted by Boobay and Maey Bautista. Features blind items that usually involves politicians.
'Kuro-Kuro' (formerly Maey Katanungan) - A parody of Saksi's segment "Barangay Saksi"
'Pa-Star' (also known as Pa-Star: Showbiz News na Paandar) - A showbiz segment hosted by Maey Bautista.
'Ang Twit-twit Mo!' - Boobay shares some tweets of different personalities from their Twitter accounts.
'Baliktaktakan' - A segment where the Anchors shared their comments/opinions on the current issues on Politics, Sports, & Showbiz.

Recurring Segments
'Tamang Hinala' - Hosted by Maey Bautista as Madam U (which is a pun for the phrase "damn you"). It features some of the predictions of different personalities in politics and showbiz.
'Buti Nga' - A parody of 24 Oras' segment Kapusong Totoo.
'Huli Cam' - An on-cam investigation
'Alam Na' - Various cast of May Tamang Balita hosts this segment, which airs before the show goes onto a commercial break.
'Weather You Like It or Not' - Formerly hosted by Janna Dominguez, and was hosted once by Aira Bermudez. A parody of TV Patrol's weather report segment "Weather Weather Lang" and Aksyon's Weather or Not segment with Lourd de Veyra and the title is also a pun on the phrase "whether you like it or not".

Occasional Segments
'You've Got the Look-alike' - Features different personalities in showbiz and politics who had their look-alike
'WOW: Word of the Week' - It features word or phrase that had a different meaning
'Wish Madam' - Hosted by Albert "Betong" Sumaya as Madame Belle Dama, where she reads some of the wishes of different personalities. But, sometimes, she didn't grant their wishes for a lot of reasons.
'Fadir Knows Best' - A segment hosted by a reactive priest named Fadir Clahey where he criticizes some of the issues of the day.
'Single Single Never Double' - Hosted by YouTube vlogger Lloyd Cadena.

Former Segments
Foolish Report - Formerly one of the original segments of May Tamang Balita
Payong May Tama - Only aired once; Was hosted by Ramon Bautista
Cooking ni Maey - Formerly hosted by Maey Bautista
Walang Basagan ng Tips! - Formerly hosted by Sheena Halili
The Impeachable - Aired during the Impeachment of Renato Corona.

Anchors
 Ramon Bautista
 Sheena Halili 
 Janna Dominguez 
 Jinri Park
 Maey Bautista
 Boobay Balbuena

Recurring anchors
 Tanya Markova
 Albert "Betong" Sumaya as Madame Belle Dama
 Fadir Clahey
 Lloyd Cadena
 Aira Bermudez

Guest anchors
Ynna Asistio
Isabel Oli
Jackie Rice
Chariz Solomon
Petra Mahalimuyak
Ethel Booba
Frencheska Farr
Daiana Menezes

References

2011 Philippine television series debuts
2013 Philippine television series endings
2010s satirical television series
Filipino-language television shows
GMA Integrated News and Public Affairs shows
GMA News TV original programming
News parodies
Television series about television